Sentinel (foaled 1968) was a Champion South African bred Thoroughbred racehorse. He was bred and raced by the Ellis family from Hartford Stud (now part of Summerhill Stud) in Kwazulu Natal and trained by Joe Joseph. He raced from 2 to 6 (1971-1975) years of age. He won 29 and placed in 18 of his 56 starts and earned ZAR207,990. He won a record 26 stakes races and was placed in another 17 stakes races. He won from 1000m to 1600m and won the Cape Flying Championship (now Grade 1) over 1000m in three successive years (1973–75).

Background

Sentinel raced widely in his racing career, winning at 8 different racecourses in four different provinces of South Africa. He was born in the same crop that produced two of the best racehorses to run in South Africa, In Full Flight and Elevation. In Full Flight was the champion of the 1968 crop and won 16 of his 20 starts. Elevation won 14 of his 34 starts, placed in 18 and established an earnings record at the time (1974). The 1968 crop also produced the outstanding stayer Numerator which won 18 races from 1200m to 3200m and placed 23 times. Sentinel was ridden by many jockeys in his 56 starts, including South African and British Champion jockey Michael Roberts and Champion Italian jockey Gianfranco Dettori, the father of Champion British jockey Lanfranco (Frankie) Dettori. He stood 17 hands and weighed 600 kg (~1300 lb).

Racing career
Sentinel made his debut on February 13, 1971 and had his 56th and last start on July 19, 1975.  He struck a purple patch between May 1973 to March 1974 and won ten of his thirteen starts and placed in the other three. He won three Cape Flying Championships (now Grade 1) over 1000m at Milnerton; raced four Woolavington Cups over 1400m at Clairwood, in which he won two and placed second in two; raced in three consecutive Drill Hall Stakes' over 1400m at Greyville, winning once and placing twice. He won two Guineas at three dead heating in the Cape of Good Hope Guineas at Milnerton and winning the South African Guineas at Greyville both over 1600m. Over sprint distances (1000m to 1400m) from 1972 to 1975 he raced 20 times winning 13 and placing in 7.

Honours 
Although there were no official awards in South Africa at the time he raced he was widely acknowledged to have been Champion Sprinter over three seasons from 4-6 (1972/73-1974/75).  He holds the record for the most number of stakes victories in South Africa - 26.  Clairwood racecourse named a race in his honour in 2012, the Sentinel Stakes and raced over 1000m. Since the closure of Clairwood racecourse in 2014 it has been run each year at Scottsville.

Stud and Retirement
Sentinel was retired to stud at Hartford, but proved to be low on fertility. Seven of his progeny made it to the racecourse and only one failed to register a win. The best was the filly, Protectress, who ran second in the 1979 South African Oaks. He lived out his days as a galloping companion and lead horse for the Hartford foals.

Record Wins Controversy 
Sentinel was thought to be the record holder of the most wins by a South African racehorse at one time. However several horses won more races with Commando (44) and Darius (41) the two leaders and both gaining their wins in the period before 1946. Since 1946, Screech Owl (32) and Hear The Drums (34), have recorded more wins than Sentinel. No horse racing in South Africa is thought to have won more recognised stakes races (26) than Sentinel.

References 

Racehorses bred in South Africa
1968 racehorse births
Racehorses trained in South Africa
Thoroughbred family 3-b